Leeds is a major town in West Yorkshire, England.

Leeds may also refer to:

Business
 Leeds City Credit Union, a savings and loans co-operative
 Leeds TV, formerly Made in Leeds, television station

Peerages
 Baron Milner of Leeds
 Duke of Leeds
 Leeds baronets

Places

Canada
 Leeds (electoral district), Ontario
 Leeds County, Ontario, historic county
 United Counties of Leeds and Grenville

England

West Yorkshire
 Leeds city centre, the core inner portion of the settlement
 City of Leeds, local government district created 1974
 Leeds City Region, the area whose economic development is supported by the Leeds City Region Partnership, a sub-regional economic development partnership

Historical entities
 Leeds manorial borough (1207–1626), within Leeds manor, within Leeds parish 
 Leeds (incorporated borough) (1626–1836)  
 Leeds Municipal Borough (1836–1889)
 County Borough of Leeds (1889–1974)
 Leeds (UK Parliament constituency) (1832–1885)
 Leeds (European Parliament constituency) (1979–1999)

Kent
 Leeds, Kent, a village near Maidstone
 Leeds Castle, a castle near Leeds, Kent
 Leeds Priory, a priory near Leeds, Kent

United States
 Leeds, Alabama, a city
 Leeds, Maine, a town
 Leeds, Massachusetts, a village within Northampton, Massachusetts
 Leeds Township, Murray County, Minnesota, a township
 Leeds, Kansas City, a neighborhood of Kansas City, Missouri
 Leeds, New York, a hamlet
 Leeds, North Dakota, a city
 Leeds Township, Benson County, North Dakota
 Leeds, Utah, a town
 Leeds, Wisconsin, a town
 Leeds (community), Wisconsin, an unincorporated community
 Leeds Center, Wisconsin, an unincorporated community

Schools

England
 University of Leeds
 Leeds Beckett University, formerly Leeds Metropolitan University and Leeds Polytechnic 
 Leeds Trinity University, Horsforth, West Yorkshire
 Leeds Arts University, formerly Leeds College of Art
 Leeds College of Music
 Leeds College of Technology
 Leeds City College
 Leeds College of Building

United States
 Leeds School of Business, Boulder, Colorado, United States

Sports
 Leeds Carnegie, sports teams associated with the Carnegie School of Physical Education
 Leeds City F.C., a 1904–19 football club
 Leeds City Vixens L.F.C., now Guiseley A.F.C. Vixens, a women's football club
 Leeds Rhinos, a rugby league club
 Leeds Road, a former football stadium in Huddersfield, England
 Leeds Tykes, a rugby union club
 Leeds United F.C., a football club
 Leeds United L.F.C., a football club

Other uses
 Leeds (surname) (including a list of people bearing the surname)
 Leeds railway station, the central station in Leeds city centre
 HM Prison Leeds, a prison in Armley, Leeds, West Yorkshire, England
 "Leeds", a song by the Indigo Girls from Shaming of the Sun

See also
 Jersey Devil or  Leeds Devil, a legendary creature said to inhabit southern New Jersey, US
 LEED (disambiguation)
 Leeds Building Society, previously Leeds and Holbeck Building Society
 Leeds Permanent Building Society, since 1995 part of the Halifax
 Leeds Talk-o-Phone, a record label
 Live at Leeds (disambiguation)
 Saint-Jacques-de-Leeds, Quebec, municipality in Quebec